Greece competed at the 1992 Summer Paralympics in Barcelona and Madrid, Spain. 7 competitors from Greece won 4 medals including 3 silver and 1 bronze and finished joint 44th in the medal table with Estonia. Greece finished on the eighteen place in Madrid with 1 silver and finished the games at the 48th place.

Medalists

See also 
 Greece at the Paralympics
 Greece at the 1992 Summer Olympics

References 

1992
1992 in Greek sport
Nations at the 1992 Summer Paralympics